The 1996 Texas A&M Aggies football team completed the season with a 6–6 record.  The Aggies had a regular season Big 12 record of 4–4.

Schedule

Game summaries

BYU

Southwestern Louisiana

The Cajuns upset then-25th-ranked Aggies.

North Texas

Colorado

Louisiana Tech

Iowa State

Kansas State

Texas Tech

Oklahoma State

Baylor

Oklahoma

Texas

Roster

References

Texas AandM
Texas A&M Aggies football seasons
Texas AandM Aggies football